St Enda's Park is a large public park in Rathfarnham in Ireland.

History
St Enda's was not always a public park. Patrick Pearse, one of the leaders of the Easter Rising in 1916 ran a school there, St Enda's School (or Scoil Éanna in Irish), in The Hermitage.  This large house was built in 1780 for the Dublin dentist Edward Hudson.  Pearse, who was a teacher at the time, bought the building in 1910 as his school in Ranelagh was getting too small.  Pearse considered the site "ideal" as his curriculum had a heavy emphasis on nature.

In the school, his brother, Willie Pearse, taught art and his sister Mary taught Irish.  The Irish poets, Joseph Plunkett and Thomas MacDonagh also taught at the school.  Both were executed after 1916 Rising as well as 15 former pupils of the school.

Leading up to the 1916 rising, the basement of the school was used as a bomb factory by Desmond Ryan and Liam Bulfin, both Irish Republican Brotherhood members.  On Easter Monday, 1916, Padraig Pearse left the school for the last time and made the 5-mile march to the GPO.

The British forces occupied the Hermitage after the Rising until, in 1919, the school was opened once more by Margaret Pearse and her daughter Margaret Mary Pearse.  The school closed its doors in 1935 due to a lack of support.  When Margaret Pearse died in 1932, she wished that the building would be given over to the state after the lifetime of her daughter, Margaret Mary.  She made only two conditions, that the house would be open throughout the year (even Christmas day) and that entry would be free of charge for the public.

The Hermitage is now the Pearse Museum dedicated to the memory of Patrick Pearse, the Pearse family, and their school, and is open to the public all year round. There are also a number of 18th and 19th century follies and garden buildings within the park.

Events
Between May and August, the  park is open between 9am and 9pm. Every Sunday from June to August, there is music entertainment in the courtyard beside the Pearse Building.

Further reading
 Nowlan, K.B. (ed.), The Making of 1916: Studies in the History of the Rising (Dublin 1969).

References 

Rathfarnham
Parks in South Dublin (county)
Pearse family